Rinty of the Desert is a 1928 American silent drama film directed by D. Ross Lederman. The film was released with a Vitaphone soundtrack with a synchronised musical score and sound effects. This film is presumed to be lost. According to Warner Bros records, the film earned $164,000 domestically and $57,000 foreign.

Cast
 Rin Tin Tin as Rinty
 Audrey Ferris as June
 Carroll Nye as Pat
 Paul Panzer as Mike Doyle
 Otto Hoffman as Pop Marlow

References

External links
 
 

1928 films
1928 drama films
Silent American drama films
American silent feature films
1920s English-language films
American black-and-white films
Films directed by D. Ross Lederman
Warner Bros. films
Lost American films
Rin Tin Tin
Lost drama films
1928 lost films
1920s American films